The Gloaming 2 (also referred to as "2") is the second studio album by the contemporary Irish/American music group The Gloaming. It was released on February 26, 2016 on Real World Records, and on Brassland Records in America, Justin Time Records in Canada, and Planet Records in Australia.

The album debuted at No.1 in the Irish Album Chart and was met with critical acclaim.

Background and recording
In an interview with the Irish Times in August 2014, fiddle player and band founder Martin Hayes said that the quintet were all eager to begin work on new material. In December 2015, The Gloaming entered Real World Studios in Wiltshire, England to record material that had mostly been written and previewed during the group’s 2015 touring schedule.

Commenting at the time on the recording sessions, vocalist Iarla Ó Lionáird felt that a “stronger” record was being made to the band’s 2015 debut, and that while the group had not become completely removed from its “initial creative area”, something of a departure had been made. Hayes, meanwhile, said that the album had “more feeling” than its predecessor because the five individuals in the band had bonded more deeply in terms of a shared aesthetic in the interim period. Hayes added that the music on The Gloaming 2 possibly had a euphoric and joyful quality, a sentiment shared by bandmate and fellow fiddle player Caoimhín Ó Raghallaigh.

Lyrically and musically, the group drew from age-old sources just as they had on their debut LP. For example, “The Pilgrim's Song” comprises two extracts of poems by the mid-20th century Irish poet Seán Ó Ríordáin – “Oilithreacht Fám Anam” and “A Sheanfhilí, Múinídh Dom Glao”, both taken from Eireaball Spideoige (1952). “Fáinleog”, meanwhile, uses a traditional lyric extract from Na Laoithe Fiannuidheachta as well as a traditional Irish jig called “The Holly Bush”. “Oisín's Song” also used a traditional lyrical motif from Na Laoithe Fiannuidheachta called “The Dialogue of Oisín and Pádraig”. "Casadh an tSúgáin" was dedicated to the memory of the traditional Irish musician Mícheál Ó Domhnaill.

The album was recorded in just five days, with pianist Thomas Bartlett producing and Patrick Dillett (assisted by Patrick Phillips) on mixing duties. In an interview, Ó Lionáird said that the music on their second record had been recorded with very few overdubs in favour of a looser and more spacious live approach. Guitarist Dennis Cahill also remarked that a natural feel was sought by the group on this record, and a decision had been made not to “overwork” the compositions by playing them over and over again.

Like their debut, The Gloaming 2 was mastered by UE Nastasi at Sterling Sound. Its album sleeve was designed by Marc Bessant, with the cover art image – entitled 'Flying Lesson' – created by US conceptual photography duo Robert and Shana ParkeHarrison

Release and reception
The Gloaming 2 was released February 2016 to positive reviews and debuted at No.1 in the Irish Album Charts.

In its review, the Herald said that the new body of work “takes things to a higher level”, while the Irish Times called it a “richly textured thing of beauty”. The Guardian once again dubbed The Gloaming’s music “exquisite” in its review, and NPR labelled the record “wistful, tender and completely transforming”. “Top-class” was the verdict of The Telegraph, while Mojo described these new recordings as “an album of dark beauty and unnerving enchantment”. The LP would finish the year with inclusions in various end-of-year lists of the Irish Times, Irish Independent, Daily Telegraph and fRoots.

A five-night residency in Dublin’s National Concert Hall was timed to coincide with the release, with all five nights selling out in record time. More high-profile live dates took place that year across Europe and North America, including London’s Royal Festival Hall, Philharmonie de Paris, Teatro Viriato in Portugal and the Kennedy Center in the US.

Track listing
Credits are adapted from the album's liner notes. Information in brackets indicates individual tunes featured on a track.

Personnel
Music
 Thomas Bartlett – piano
 Dennis Cahill – guitar
 Martin Hayes – fiddle
 Iarla Ó Lionáird – vocals
 Caoimhín Ó Raghallaigh – Hardanger d'Amore

Production
 Thomas Bartlett – production
 Patrick Dillett – mixing, engineering
 Patrick Phillips – assistant engineering
 UE Nastasi – mastering at Sterling Sound
 Marc Bessant – design
 Robert and Shana ParkeHarrison – cover art
 Rich Gilligan – photography
 BARQUE LLC – management

Accolades

Charts

References

2016 albums
The Gloaming albums
Real World Records albums
Brassland Records albums